Kosmos 60 ( meaning Cosmos 60) was an E-6 No.9 probe (Ye-6 series), launched by the Soviet Union. It was the sixth attempt at a lunar soft-landing mission, with a design similar to that of Luna 4.

Kosmos 60 was launched by a Molniya 8K78 rocket, serial number G15000-24, flying from Site 1/5 at the Baikonur Cosmodrome. The launch took place at 09:25:31 GMT. Instead, the spacecraft remained stranded in Earth orbit. A later investigation indicated that there might have been a short circuit in the electric converter within the control system of the spacecraft (which also controlled the Blok L stage) preventing engine ignition. The satellite reentered the Earth's atmosphere on 17 March 1965.

Kosmos 60 carried two instruments: an imaging system and the SBM-10 radiation detector.

References 

Kosmos 0060
Kosmos 0060
Spacecraft launched in 1965